Mandar Assembly constituency is one of the 81 constituencies of the Jharkhand Vidhan Sabha, located in Ranchi district. Mandar is part of Lohardaga Lok Sabha constituency along with four other Vidhan Sabha (Legislative Assembly) segments, namely, Sisai, Gumla, Bishnupur and Lohardaga. This constituency is reserved for the candidates belonging to the Scheduled tribes.

Members of Legislative Assembly

^ by-poll

Election results

2022

See also
Jharkhand Vidhan Sabha
List of states of India by type of legislature

References

Assembly constituencies of Jharkhand